Hampton Wildman Parker (5 July 1897 – 2 September 1968) was an English zoologist.

Parker was Keeper of Zoology at the Natural History Museum from 1947 to 1957. He is the author of several works on snakes and frogs: Parker discovered a new species of lizard on the Seychelles, which he described and named Vesey-Fitzgerald's burrowing skink (Janetaescincus veseyfitzgeraldi ) after entomologist Leslie Desmond Foster Vesey-Fitzgerald.


Books by H.W. Parker
1934. A Monograph of the Frogs of the Family Microhylidae. London: Trustees of the British Museum (Natural History).
1963. Snakes. London: Hale.
1965. Natural History of Snakes. London: Trustees of the British Museum (Natural History).
1977. Snakes, a Natural History. University of Queensland Press.

Eponyms
Parker is honored in the specific names of the following reptiles: Cercosaura parkeri, Chamaelycus parkeri, Emoia parkeri, Myriopholis parkeri, Phelsuma parkeri, Prasinohaema parkeri, Sphaerodactylus parkeri,  Tropidophis parkeri, and Zonurus parkeri (a synonym of Cordylus tropidosternum).

References

External links

20th-century British botanists
Employees of the Natural History Museum, London
1897 births
1968 deaths